Sonia Tremont (born 2 July 1992) is a Luxembourger footballer who plays as a midfielder. She has been a member of the Luxembourg women's national team.

International career
Tremont capped for Luxembourg at senior level during the UEFA Women's Euro 2013 qualifying (preliminary round), including a 2–0 win against Latvia on 3 March 2011.

See also
List of Luxembourg women's international footballers

References

1992 births
Living people
Women's association football midfielders
Luxembourgian women's footballers
Luxembourg women's international footballers